New Pop was a loosely defined British-centric pop music movement consisting of ambitious, DIY-minded artists who achieved commercial success in the early 1980s through sources such as MTV. Rooted in the post-punk movement of the late 1970s, the movement spanned a wide variety of styles and artists, including acts such as Orange Juice, the Human League and ABC. The term "rockist", a pejorative against people who shunned this type of music, coincided and was associated with New Pop.<ref name="Now That's What I Call New Pop!">Harvel, Jess. "Now That's What I Call New Pop!". Pitchfork Media. 12 September 2005.</ref>

"New Music" is a roughly equivalent but slightly more expansive umbrella term for a pop music and cultural phenomenon in the US associated with the Second British Invasion. The term was used by the music industry and by American music journalists during the 1980s to characterize then-new movements like New Pop and New Romanticism.

Characteristics
Many New Pop artists created music that sweetened less commercial and experimental aspects with a pop coating. Entryism became a popular concept for groups at the time. New Music acts were danceable, had an androgynous look, emphasized the synthesizer and drum machines, wrote about the darker side of romance, and were British. They rediscovered rockabilly, Motown, ska, reggae and merged it with African rhythms to produce what was described as a "fertile, stylistic cross-pollination". Author Simon Reynolds noted that the New Pop movement "involved a conscious and brave attempt to bridge the separation between 'progressive' pop and mass/chart pop – a divide which has existed since 1967, and is also, broadly, one between boys and girls, middle-class and working-class."

The term "New Music" or "New Pop" was used loosely to describe synthpop groups such as the Human League, soul-disco acts such as ABC, new wave acts such as Elvis Costello and the Pretenders, jangle pop bands such as Orange Juice, and American MTV stars such as Michael Jackson. Stephen Holden of the New York Times wrote at the time that New Music was more about its practitioners than their sound. Teenage girls and males that had grown tired of traditional "phallic" guitar driven rock embraced New Music. New Music was a singles oriented (both 7 inch and the then new 12 inch) phenomenon, reverting the 1970s rock music album orientation.

Etymology
During the late 1970s, "New Musick"  was one of the labels that was applied to certain post-punk groups. The term "post-punk" was also deployed interchangeably with "new wave". In the New Rolling Stone Encyclopedia of Rock (2001), "new wave" is described as a "virtually meaningless" term. By the early 1980s, British journalists had largely abandoned "new wave" in favor of other terms such as "synthpop", and in 1983, the term of choice for the US music industry had become "new music".

History

In the wake of the punk rock explosion of the late 1970s, the new wave and post-punk genres emerged, informed by a desire for experimentation, creativity and forward movement. Music journalist Paul Morley, whose writing in British music magazine the NME championed the post-punk movement in late 1970s, has been credited as an influential voice in the development of New Pop following the dissipation of post-punk, advocating "overground brightness" over underground sensibilities. Around this time, the term "rockist" would gain popularity to disparagingly describe music that privileged traditionalist rock styles.  According to Pitchforks Jess Harvel: "If new pop had an architect, it was [the writer] Paul Morley."

As the 1980s began, a number of musicians desired to broaden these movements to reach a more mainstream audience. In 1980, the New Music Seminar made its debut. It was designed to help young new wave artists gain entrance into the American music industry. The event grew rapidly in popularity and encouraged the shift away from the use of "new wave" to "New Music" in the United States. Unlike in Great Britain, attempts prior to 1982 to bring new wave and the music video to American audiences had brought mixed results. During 1982, New Music acts began to appear on the charts in the United States, and clubs there that played them were packed.

In reaction to New Music, album-oriented rock radio stations doubled the amount of new acts they played and the format "Hot Hits" emerged. By 1983, in a year when half of the new artists came out of New Music, acts such as Duran Duran, Culture Club and Men at Work were dominating the charts and creating an alternate music and cultural mainstream. Annie Lennox and Boy George were the two figures most associated with New Music.

Criticism and decline
Criticism of New Pop emerged from both supporters of traditional rock and newer experimental rock. These critics looked at New Pop as pro corporate at expense of rock music's anti-authoritarian tradition. Critics believed New Pop's embrace of synths and videos were ways of covering in many cases lack of talent. The heavy metal magazine Hit Parader regularly used the homophobic slur "faggot" to describe New Music musicians. The 1985 Dire Straits song "Money for Nothing", which hit number 1 in the United States, contained the line "The little faggot with the earring and the make-up" and used the term "faggot" several other times. The lyrics were taken verbatim from the language of a New York appliance store worker whom lead singer Mark Knopfler had observed watching MTV. Assistant professor/author/musician Theo Cateforis stated these are examples of homophobia used in the defense of "real rock" against new music.Cateforis p. 233 reference number 28

Richard Blade, a disc jockey at Los Angeles radio station KROQ-FM, speaking of the late 1980s said, "You felt there was a winding-down of music. Thomas Dolby's album had bombed, Duran Duran had gone through a series of breakups, The Smiths had broken up, Spandau Ballet had gone away, and people were just shaking their heads going, 'What happened to all this new music?' " Theo Cateforis contends that the New Music evolved into modern rock that while different, retained New Music's uptempo feel and still came from the rock disco/club scene.

References

Bibliography

 
 

Further reading
Rimmer, Dave. Like Punk Never Happened: Culture Club and the New Pop''. Faber and Faber, 2011, .

1980s in music
New wave music
Pop music
Post-punk
Progressive pop
1980s in British music
British popular music